The Kareem Abdul-Jabbar Center of the Year Award is an annual basketball award given by the Naismith Memorial Basketball Hall of Fame to the top men's collegiate center. Following  the success of the Bob Cousy Award which had been awarded since 2004, the award was one of four new awards (along with the Jerry West Award, Julius Erving Award and Karl Malone Award) created as part of the inaugural College Basketball Awards show in 2015. It is named after three-time NCAA Men's Division I Basketball Champion, three-time NCAA basketball tournament Most Outstanding Player, and three-time National Player of the Year Kareem Abdul-Jabbar. The inaugural winner was Frank Kaminsky.

Luka Garza of Iowa is the only player to repeat as recipient of the award.

Winners

Winners by school

References

External links
Official website

Awards established in 2015
College basketball trophies and awards in the United States